The West Wales Raiders were a semi-professional rugby league club based in Llanelli, Wales. They competed in League 1, the third tier of the British rugby league system, from 2018 until 2022.

The club was founded in 2015 as an amateur club. In July 2017, owner Andrew Thorne bought League 1 club South Wales Ironmen, relocating them to Stebonheath Park in Llanelli. The Ironmen were renamed West Wales Raiders in 2018 and continued to play at Stebonheath Park.

History

In July 2017, West Wales Raiders owner Andrew Thorne bought League 1 club South Wales Ironmen. The Ironmen moved to Llanelli's Stebonheath Park effective immediately. The club was rebranded the West Wales Raiders in 2018 and remained in League 1 and, as such, the Raiders can be regarded as a continuation of the Ironmen club, and their previous incarnation the South Wales Scorpions. 

In April 2018, the club were on the receiving end of a record score and losing margin when they lost 0–144 to York, the previous highest scoring game was in November 1994 when Huddersfield beat Blackpool by 142–4, the losing margin was also equalled the next day in 1994 by Barrow who beat Nottingham City 138–0.  An Australian news article after the York defeat suggested the team as "the world’s worst rugby league team ever".

The West Wales Raiders finished the 2018 Betfred League 1 season winless and on negative points. The Rugby Football League imposed a four-point, retrospective deduction after the club pleaded guilty to breaching a number of Operational Rules regarding the fielding of ineligible players.

The 2019 season saw the West Wales Raiders again finish at the foot of the table but a win was registered in a home match against Coventry Bears. In 2019 they played 20 league matches and won 1, lost 19, scoring a total of 222 points and conceding 1091.

In 2020 former Wales rugby union international Gavin Henson switched codes and signed for the Raiders.

In the 2021 League 1 season, West Wales finished bottom of the table failing to win a single game for the entire year. In the 2022 League 1 season, West Wales finished last on the table winning only one game for the entire year and losing their other 19 matches conceding 1196 points.

On 22 December 2022 the joint owners of the club, Andrew Thorne and Peter Tiffin, announced that the club had withdrawn from League One and the Challenge Cup for 2023.

Seasons

Records
Biggest win: 
44-16 vs  Coventry Bears (at Llanelli, 20 July 2019)
Biggest defeat: 
144-0 vs  York City Knights (at Bootham Crescent, 29 April 2018)

Notes

References

External links
 Raiders Rugby League website
 Wales Rugby League Website

Rugby league in Wales
Welsh rugby league teams
Sport in Llanelli
2015 establishments in Wales
Rugby clubs established in 2015
Defunct rugby league teams in Wales